Heinrich Bernhard Karl "Hans" Hoffmeister (17 March 1901 – 9 January 1980) was a German discus thrower who set a world record at 48.77 m in 1928. He showed much worse results at the 1928 Summer Olympics (best throw 39.17 m) and placed 25th.

Hoffmeister won the national discus title in 1926, 1930 and 1931, and finished second in javelin in 1927. Next year he won the Irish discus and javelin titles. Hoffmeister was a graphic artist and drew portraits and cartoons of many German athletes at the 1928 Olympics. He later worked for German daily newspapers.

References

1901 births
1980 deaths
German male discus throwers
German male javelin throwers
Athletes (track and field) at the 1928 Summer Olympics
Olympic athletes of Germany
Sportspeople from Münster
20th-century German people